This is a list of electoral division results for the 2022 Australian federal election in the state of Tasmania.

This election was held using instant-runoff voting. In Tasmania in this election, there was one  "turn-over". In Lyons, a Labor candidate who did not lead in the first count took the seat in the end.

Overall results

Results by division

Bass

Braddon

Clark

Franklin

Lyons

References

Tasmania 2022
2022 Australian federal election